Agder Tidend was a Norwegian newspaper, published in Kristiansand and mainly distributed in the district of Agder, from 1919 to 1985.

History and profile
Agder Tidend was started on 1 September 1919. The first editor was Ivar Høvik. Among its later editors were Hans Aarnes from 1923 to 1932, and Ragnar Udjus from 1965 to 1968.

References

1919 establishments in Norway
1985 disestablishments in Norway
Centre Party (Norway) newspapers
Defunct newspapers published in Norway
Norwegian-language newspapers
Newspapers established in 1919
Publications disestablished in 1985